Pádraig Clancy is a Gaelic footballer from County Laois.

Playing career
Clancy plays with his local club Timahoe and won three Laois Intermediate Football Championships, in 2000, 2004 and 2010.

Clancy usually played at midfield for his county. He emerged onto the scene in 1998 as part of the Laois minor team that retained the Leinster Minor Football Championship title before going on to lose the All-Ireland Minor Football Championship final to Tyrone. In 2003, he was part of the Laois team that won the Leinster Senior Football Championship title for the first time since 1946. He announced his retirement from inter-county football in 2013.

In 2005, he won an Interprovincial Championship medal with his province Leinster.

Honours
 1 Leinster Senior Football Championship (2003)
 1 Leinster Minor Football Championship (1998)
 1 Railway Cup (2005)
 3 Laois Intermediate Football Championship (2000, 2004, 2010)

References

External links
Profile from gaainfo.com
2003 Leinster Final report from rte.ie

Living people
Laois inter-county Gaelic footballers
Timahoe Gaelic footballers
1980 births